Brian Patrick Butler is an American actor, film director, screenwriter and film producer. He is known for creating Friend of the World and his performances in We All Die Alone and South of 8.

Life and career
While pursuing a degree in theatre arts at San Diego State University, Butler directed a production of Stephen Adly Guirgis's play The Last Days of Judas Iscariot. After graduating, Butler performed at New Village Arts Theatre in the West Coast premieres of The House Theatre of Chicago's The Nutcracker and Sarah Ruhl's Stage Kiss. He was also cast in Return to the Forbidden Planet at New Village Arts and played KJ in Ion Theatre's production of Annie Baker's The Aliens. During this time, Butler acted in the feature films South of 8 and Thane of East County before writing and directing two short films: Hatred and The Phantom Hour. In 2017, Butler starred in the short film Assumption and later in Hacksaw, a feature-length slasher film with Sadie Katz and Cortney Palm. He received nominations at Oceanside International Film Festival and Georgia Shorts Film Festival for his performance in We All Die Alone.

Friend of the World
In 2016, Butler formulated a script titled Friend of the World. In 2020, the film premiered virtually at the Oceanside International Film Festival during the COVID 19 pandemic. Following the premiere, Butler mentioned he was inspired by the works of John Carpenter and Samuel Beckett. The film was distributed by Troma Entertainment in 2022.

Filmography 
Film

References

External links

 Brian Patrick Butler at Moviefone
 Official website

Living people
Year of birth missing (living people)
21st-century American male actors
21st-century American screenwriters
American experimental filmmakers
American film directors
American film editors
American film producers
American male film actors
American male screenwriters
American surrealist artists
Film directors from California
Film producers from California
Horror film directors
Male actors from San Diego
Science fiction film directors
Screenwriters from California
Surrealist filmmakers